Roberto Ottaviano (Bari, 21 December 1957) is an Italian jazz saxophonist.

Discography 
 Arrigo Cappelletti/Roberto Ottaviano Quartet, Samashi (Splasc(h), 1986)
 Daniele Cavallanti Double Trio, The Leo (Red Record, 1987)
 Mingus: Portraits in six Colours (Splasc(h), 1988)
 Items from the Old Earth (Splasc(h), 1990)
 Above Us (Splasc(h), 1990)
 Hybrid and Hot (Splasc(h), 1995)
 Black Spirits Are Here Again  with Mal Waldron (DIW, 1996)
 Live in Israel (2002)

References

1957 births
Italian jazz saxophonists
Male saxophonists
People from Bari
Living people
21st-century saxophonists
21st-century Italian male musicians
Male jazz musicians